F&P Manufacturing Inc. abbreviated F&P Mfg Inc. is a Japanese automotive parts supplier based in North America. They make components such as subframes, trailing arms, Lower Arm and Pedals for Honda, Toyota and General Motors vehicles. F&P Mfg inc. operates plants in Tottenham, Ontario, Canada and Stratford, Ontario, Canada. Its parent company F-Tech was founded in 1947 and is located in Saitama Prefecture, Japan.

External link 
F-Tech's Official Site

Auto parts suppliers of Canada